The Treaty of Fort Adams was signed on December 17, 1801, between the Choctaw (an American Indian tribe) and the United States Government. The commissioners reported to President Thomas Jefferson that

for the first time, the bounty of the United States was implored, and we were supplicated for materials, tools, implements, and instructors, to aid their exertions, and to direct their labors ... hope, that by the liberal and well directed attention of the Government, these people may be made happy and useful; and that the United States may be saved the pain and expense of expelling or destroying them.

Significance for the Choctaw Nation

Although the treaty was originally designed for the creation of the Natchez Trace, it would be the first in a series of treaties that would eventually lead to the expulsion of the Choctaw Nation east of the Mississippi River.

Terms

The preamble begins with,

1. Peace and Friendship 
2. Wagon road through Choctaw country
3. Boundary defined
4. Notification of survey
5. Financial compensations
6. When the treaty takes effect

Signatories

James Wilkinson, Benjamin Hawkins, Andrew Pickens, Buckshun Nubby, Mingo Hom Massatubby.

See also

List of Choctaw Treaties
Treaty of Hopewell
Treaty of Fort Confederation
Treaty of Hoe Buckintoopa
Treaty of Mount Dexter
Treaty of Fort St. Stephens
Treaty of Doak's Stand
Treaty of Washington City
Treaty of Dancing Rabbit Creek
List of treaties

Citations

External links
(Treaty with the Choctaw, 1801)

Fort Adams
1801 in the United States
1801 treaties